The Lycoming O-340 is a family of four-cylinder horizontally opposed, carburetor-equipped aircraft engines, that was manufactured by Lycoming Engines in the mid-1950s.

Design and development
The O-340 was designed by Lycoming specifically for the TEMCO-Riley D-16A Twin Navion project. Jack Riley, the designer of that aircraft was interested in an upgraded version of the Lycoming O-320 that would produce more power to give the Twin Navion a better single-engine service ceiling. The Lycoming O-360 was still years away in development and so a modification of the O-320 was undertaken by Lycoming. The O-320 received longer cylinder barrels and a crankshaft with a longer stroke to increase displacement and different piston connecting rods. The engine was later used in a number of airplanes and helicopters and also in amateur-built aircraft designs.

All have a displacement of 340.4 cubic inches (5.58 litres) and the cylinders have air-cooled heads.

The O-340 series was certified under Type Certificate E-277 and first approved on 20 July 1954. The engines are approved for both tractor and pusher applications.

Variants
O-340-A1A
Four-cylinder, horizontally opposed, 340.4 cubic inches (5.58 litres),  at 2700, dry weight , Marvel-Schebler MA-4-5 carburetor, Scintilla S4LN-20 and S4LN-21 magneto. Minimum fuel grade 91/96 avgas. Certified on 13 January 1955.

O-340-A2A
Four-cylinder, horizontally opposed, 340.4 cubic inches (5.58 litres),  at 2700, dry weight , Marvel-Schebler MA-4-5 carburetor, Scintilla S4LN-20 and S4LN-21 magneto. Minimum fuel grade 91/96 avgas. Identical to the A1A but with  no provision for a hydraulic propeller control. Certified on 16 November 1956.

O-340-B1A
Four-cylinder, horizontally opposed, 340.4 cubic inches (5.58 litres),  at 2700, dry weight , Marvel-Schebler MA-4-5 carburetor, Scintilla S4LN-20 and S4LN-21 magneto. Minimum fuel grade 80/87 avgas. Identical to the A1A except with a reduced 7.15:1 compression ratio and 160 hp to run on 80/87 fuel. Certified on 20 July 1954. The O-340-B1A was originally certified as just the "O-340", but the designation was changed to "O-340-B1A" on 27 September 1956.

Applications

Brantly B-2 and B-2A helicopter
Cessna 170 (modified under STC)
Oakland Super V
Piper Apache (modified under STC)
TEMCO-Riley D-16A Twin Navion

Specifications (O-340-A1A)

See also

References

O-340
1950s aircraft piston engines